Crunchyroll, LLC, previously known as Funimation from 1994 to 2022, is an American entertainment company owned by Japanese conglomerate Sony as a joint venture between Sony Pictures and Sony Music Entertainment Japan's Aniplex that specializes in the dubbing and distribution of East Asian media, with a long history of working with Japanese anime. The company is headquartered in Coppell, Texas and Culver City, California with offices in San Francisco, New York City, Melbourne, Tokyo, Paris, Roubaix, Berlin, Chișinău, Lausanne, and London, and is a member of The Association of Japanese Animations (AJA).

The company was founded in May 1994 as Funimation Productions by Gen Fukunaga and his wife Cindy Brennan in Silicon Valley, with funding by Daniel Cocanougher and his family, who became investors in the company, which then relocated to North Richland Hills, later to Flower Mound, and after that in Coppell. Funimation became one of the leading distributors of anime and other foreign entertainment properties in North America. It licensed popular series, such as Dragon Ball, One Piece, Yu Yu Hakusho, My Hero Academia, Attack on Titan, Fairy Tail, Black Clover, Fruits Basket, Assassination Classroom, and Tokyo Ghoul among many others.

Funimation was acquired by Navarre Corporation in May 2005; in April 2011, Navarre sold Funimation to a group of investors that included Fukunaga for $24 million. From 2017 to 2019, the Japanese conglomerate Sony owned a 95% stake in the company through its Sony Pictures Television division. In March 2022, the company itself was rebranded into Crunchyroll, LLC after acquiring the streaming service of the same name in August 2021, but the Funimation brand currently co-exists with Crunchyroll and remains in active use.

Corporate overview
Crunchyroll, LLC operates independently from other Sony subsidiaries and is a joint venture between U.S.-based Sony Pictures Entertainment and Japan’s Aniplex, a subsidiary of Sony Music Entertainment Japan., both subsidiaries of Tokyo-based Sony Group Corporation. It is headquartered in the Cypress Waters Complex in Coppell, Texas and Sony Pictures Studios in Culver City, California with offices in San Francisco, New York City, London, Paris, Roubaix, Lausanne, Chișinău, Tokyo and Melbourne. The company has a revenue of $27.5 million as of 2022.

The company operates services in the North American market, with international operations in United Kingdom via Crunchyroll UK and Ireland, Australia and New Zealand via Madman Anime and in Europe, Middle East, Africa and Quebec via Crunchyroll EMEA.

As of January 1, 2023, the leadership of Crunchyroll, LLC includes:

 Gen Fukunaga, founder and chairman 
 Rahul Purini, President and CEO
 Asa Suehira, chief content officer
 Barb Bidan, chief people officer
 Brady McCollum, chief operating officer
 Elizabeth Cohen, General Counsel
 Gita Rebbapragada, chief marketing officer
 Joellen Ferrer, SVP, integration management 
 Kailel Roberts, chief product officer
 Mitchel Berger, SVP, global commerce
 Terry Li, SVP, emerging business
 Travis Page, chief financial officer

History

Early history

In the early 1990s, Japanese-born businessman Gen Fukunaga was approached by his uncle, Nagafumi Hori, who was working as a producer for Toei Company. Hori proposed that if Fukunaga could start a production company and raise enough money, Toei Animation would license the rights to the Dragon Ball franchise to the United States. Fukunaga met with co-worker Daniel Cocanougher, whose family owned a feed mill in Decatur, Texas, and convinced Cocanougher's family to sell their business and serve as an investor for his company.

The company was founded on May 9, 1994, as Funimation Productions. The company was originally based in Silicon Valley, but eventually relocated to North Richland Hills, Texas. They initially collaborated with other companies on Dragon Ball, such as BLT Productions, Ocean Studios, Pioneer and Saban Entertainment. In the United States, Dragon Ball debuted in syndication in 1995, but aired for only 13 episodes due to poor ratings. Funimation then decided to debut Dragon Ball Z in syndication in 1996. Compared with the original Dragon Ball, Dragon Ball Z saw greater success among American audiences, which resulted in Funimation securing an hour-long, two-episode, second season time block for the fall of 1997. Cartoon Network began airing Dragon Ball Z as part of its Toonami programming block in 1998, which quickly became the highest-rated show on the block and garnered a large following. The success of Dragon Ball Z is credited for allowing Funimation to acquire other licensed titles.

Beginning in September 2003, Funimation signed a North American home video deal with Canada-based Nelvana. Such titles released included Redwall, Pecola, Tales from the Cryptkeeper, Timothy Goes to School and the Disney Channel TV special The Santa Claus Brothers. In July 2004, the company launched a pre-school and family-oriented division called Our Time Family Entertainment.

Acquisition by Navarre Corporation

On May 11, 2005, Funimation was acquired by Navarre Corporation for US$100.4 million in cash and 1.8 million shares of Navarre stock. As part of the acquisition, Gen Fukunaga was retained as head of the company, transitioning to the position of CEO, and the company's name was changed from Funimation Productions to Funimation Entertainment. In 2007, Funimation moved from North Richland Hills, Texas to Flower Mound, Texas. Funimation moved into the Lakeside Business District with a ten-year lease.

According to an interview in February 2008 with Navarre Corporation CEO Cary Deacon, Funimation was in early stage negotiations to acquire some of the titles licensed through Geneon's USA division, which ceased operations in December 2007. In July 2008, Funimation confirmed that they had acquired distribution rights to several Geneon titles, including some that Geneon had left unfinished when they withdrew from the U.S. market. At Anime Expo 2008, Funimation announced that it had acquired over 30 titles from the Sojitz catalog that had previously been licensed by ADV Films. In 2009, Funimation signed a deal with Toei Animation to stream several of its anime titles online through the Funimation website.

Second stint as an independent company
On May 27, 2010, Navarre Corporation announced that it began negotiating a potential sale of Funimation. It was also announced that if the sale took place, Funimation would be reclassified as a "discounted operation" starting in the first quarter of 2011. On September 16, 2010, Navarre announced that six potential buyers were interested in acquiring Funimation. In the first quarter of 2011, Navarre reclassified Funimation as "discounted operations". On April 4, 2011, Navarre released a statement announcing that Funimation had been sold to a group of investors that included original owner Gen Fukunaga for $24 million. It was also announced that Navarre would remain as exclusive distributor of Funimation's titles.

On October 14, 2011, Funimation announced a partnership with Niconico, the English language version of Nico Nico Douga, to form the Funico brand for the licensing of anime for streaming and home video release. From this point on, virtually all titles simulcasted by Niconico were acquired by Funimation. In 2014, Funimation released Dragon Ball Z: Battle of Gods to theaters in partnership with Screenvision. Based on its success, Funimation launched its own theatrical division in December 2014. On June 22, 2015, Funimation and Universal Pictures Home Entertainment announced a multi-year home video distribution deal. The deal allowed UPHE to manage distribution and sales of Funimation's catalog of titles. Universal began distributing Funimation's titles in October of that year.

In January 2016, Funimation introduced a new logo and announced the rebranding of their streaming platform as "FunimationNow". In April 2016, they launched their service in the UK and Ireland.

On September 8, 2016, Funimation announced a partnership with Crunchyroll. Select Funimation titles would be streamed subtitled on Crunchyroll, while select Crunchyroll titles would be streamed on FunimationNow, including upcoming dubbed content. In addition, Funimation would act as the distributor for Crunchyroll's home video catalog.

On May 18, 2017, Shout! Factory acquired the North American distribution rights to In This Corner of the World, with a U.S. theatrical release to take place on August 11, 2017, co-released by Funimation Films.

Sony ownership
In May 2017, it was reported that Universal Studios and Sony Pictures Television were interested in purchasing Funimation; however, Universal decided not to proceed with the bidding. On July 31, 2017, Sony Pictures Television announced that it would buy a controlling 95% stake in Funimation for $143 million, a deal that was approved by the United States Department of Justice on August 22, 2017. This deal allowed Funimation to have synergies with Sony's Animax and Kids Station divisions and "direct access to the creative pipeline". The deal was closed on October 27, 2017.

On February 16, 2018, it was reported that Shout! Factory's Shout! Studios division acquired the U.S./Canadian distribution rights to Big Fish & Begonia and partnered with Funimation Films again for distribution. On July 12, 2018, it was announced that Funimation Films had picked up licensing rights for Dragon Ball Super: Broly in North America and that its English dub would premiere in theaters sometime in January 2019 in the United States and Canada, only around a month after its national premiere in Japan.

On August 7, 2018, AT&T fully acquired Otter Media, owner of Crunchyroll. On October 18, 2018, Funimation and Crunchyroll announced that their partnership with would end on November 9, 2018, as a result of Sony Pictures Television's acquisition of Funimation. Despite the home video releases being unaffected and still going on as planned, select Funimation content would be removed from Crunchyroll, and subtitled content would return to FunimationNow. Additionally, it was also announced that Funimation would be removed from Otter Media-owned streaming service VRV entirely, being replaced by HIDIVE. In December 2018, it was reported that another reason the partnership ended was due to a dispute concerning international expansion. On December 4, 2018, Funimation inked an exclusive multi-year first-look SVOD deal with Hulu.

On February 1, 2019, Gen Fukunaga announced that he would be stepping down as general manager, and transitioning to chairman of the company, with Colin Decker assuming the role of general manager in May 2019. On March 23, 2019, at AnimeJapan 2019, Funimation announced that they had partnered with Chinese streaming service Bilibili to jointly license anime titles for both the U.S. and Chinese markets.

On May 29, 2019, Funimation announced that they had acquired Manga Entertainment's UK branch, and immediately consolidated the former's UK business into the latter's. On July 5, 2019, Funimation announced at Anime Expo that they had reached a streaming partnership with Right Stuf, with select titles from Nozomi Entertainment being made available on FunimationNow later in the year. On August 31, 2019, Aniplex of America announced on Twitter that they would be partnering with Funimation Films to co-release Rascal Does Not Dream of a Dreaming Girl theatrically in the U.S. on October 2, 2019, and in Canada on October 4, 2019.

Aniplex/SPT joint venture; International expansion
On September 24, 2019, Sony Pictures Television and Aniplex announced that they were consolidating their international anime streaming businesses under a new joint venture, Funimation Global Group, LLC., with Funimation general manager Colin Decker leading the joint venture. The joint venture would operate under Funimation's branding, and allow Funimation to acquire and distribute titles with Aniplex subsidiaries Wakanim, Madman Anime and AnimeLab. The first title under the joint venture, Fate/Grand Order - Absolute Demonic Front: Babylonia, would receive a 30-day exclusivity on FunimationNow, AnimeLab and Wakanim, and provide Funimation exclusive rights to the English dub for one year.

In December 2019, Funimation launched a "Decade of Anime" poll in which fans voted for their favorite anime across multiple categories.

On January 24, 2020, Funimation announced it would be merging its online catalog into AnimeLab for Australian and New Zealand audiences, and would shut down FunimationNow for Australia and New Zealand on March 30.

On May 1, 2020, Funimation announced that they formed a partnership with Kodansha Comics to host a series of weekly watch parties. On May 4, Funimation announced that they had struck a deal with NIS America to stream select titles on FunimationNow. Funimation would also announce that same day that they would hold a virtual anime convention called "FunimationCon" on July 3–4, 2020. It was one of several virtual events taking the place of that year's Anime Expo, which announced its cancellation on April 17.

On July 3, 2020, Funimation announced at FunimationCon that they would expand their streaming service to Latin America, starting with Mexico and Brazil in Q4 2020, with one of the first dubbed titles released being Tokyo Ghoul:re. Funimation later revealed that they would launch their Latin American services in December 2020. However, they launched their service early on November 18, 2020.

On September 9, 2020, Funimation announced that they had reached a distribution partnership with Viz Media, with Viz Media titles being made available to stream on Funimation's website. The deal was made after select Viz titles such as Part I of Naruto and the first 75 episodes of Hunter × Hunter were previously made available on FunimationNow. On December 2, 2020, Brazilian TV channel Loading announced a content partnership with Sony Pictures Entertainment. Funimation titles being included in the partnership was hinted at, but not confirmed. Five days later, it was officially confirmed that Funimation titles would be included in the partnership.

On November 24, 2020, Funimation announced they had partnered with Sunrise to stream select Gundam titles such as Mobile Suit Gundam, Mobile Suit Gundam SEED, and later Mobile Suit Gundam Wing and Mobile Suit Zeta Gundam. Some Gundam titles already streamed on Funimation prior to said partnership like Mobile Suit Gundam: Iron-Blooded Orphans.

To unify the company's image abroad, Manga Entertainment was rebranded as Funimation UK in the UK and Ireland, on April 19, 2021, with AnimeLab relaunched under the Funimation brand in Australia and New Zealand, from June 17, 2021. Afterwards, Funimation launched their streaming services to three South American countries of Colombia, Chile, and Peru on June 16, 2021.

On September 1, 2021, Funimation and Gonzo announced a partnership to upload select remastered titles on their respective YouTube channels until November 30. These titles were Ragnarok the Animation, Witchblade and Burst Angel.

Relaunch as Crunchyroll

However, on March 24, 2021, it was reported that the United States Department of Justice had extended its antitrust review of the acquisition. The acquisition of Crunchyroll was completed on August 9, 2021, with Sony stating in their press release that they would create a unified anime subscription using their anime businesses as soon as possible. Crunchyroll confirmed four days later that VRV was included in the acquisition.

On January 25, 2022, Crunchyroll announced that they were going to release Jujutsu Kaisen 0 in theaters on March 18, 2022, in the United States and Canada. The film launched in over 1,500 theaters, as well as some IMAX theatres, in both sub and dub. They also stated that the feature would be coming soon to theaters in the United Kingdom, Ireland, Australia, New Zealand, France, Germany, and Latin America among other countries. This is the first Crunchyroll film to be distributed in association with Funimation Films.

On March 1, 2022, it was announced that the Funimation, Wakanim and VRV SVOD services would be consolidated into Crunchyroll. Additionally, it was announced that Funimation Global Group, LLC would undergo a rebrand as Crunchyroll, LLC. Fourteen days later, it was announced that Funimation's home video releases would be distributed under the Crunchyroll banner, with the latter's logo replacing that of the former on the spine and back of the covers for each new release that comes out starting with its June 2022 slate.

Following the Russian military invasion of Ukraine, Crunchyroll announced on March 11 that it would halt services in Russia, thus shutting down operations of Wakanim and Crunchyroll EMEA entirely, in line with global sanctions. Its parent company Sony donated $2 million in humanitarian aid to Ukraine.

On April 5, 2022, the company announced that Funimation's YouTube channel was rebranded as Crunchyroll Dubs and that it would serve as Crunchyroll's channel for English-dubbed content while English-subtitled content would still be uploaded on their Crunchyroll Collection channel. The company also stated that they would release an English-dubbed first episode of an anime series every Saturday at 3:00pm ET on the channel, starting with Re:Zero − Starting Life in Another World on April 9, 2022. Three days later, another announcement was made in that the Funimation Shop would be moved to the Crunchyroll Store. Two weeks later, CEO Colin Decker stepped down from his position. He was replaced by COO Rahul Purini. As a result of the merger in March 2022, pre-existing shows such as My Hero Academia, Uzaki-chan Wants to Hang Out!, and others that were streaming on Funimation will remain along with newer seasons until a full migration of its licensed catalog is transferred over to Crunchyroll. New series such as Spy × Family, Chainsaw Man, and A Couple of Cuckoos are only released on Crunchyroll, albeit with the dubbing production done in the Coppell studios. Once the content migration is completed, the Funimation OTT platform is expected to be sunset.

On August 4, 2022, Crunchyroll acquired Anime eCommerce retailer Right Stuf.  Right Stuf's adult/hentai content was removed as part of the acquisition.

On September 20, 2022, Kyle McCarley's contract to voice Shigeo Kageyama, the protagonist of Mob Psycho 100, was not renewed by Crunchyroll. McCarley, who is a member of SAG-AFTRA, had offered to work on a non-union contract for the third season, on the condition that Crunchyroll meet with SAG-AFTRA representatives to discuss potential future contracts. Crunchyroll refused the offer, sparking criticism from anime fans and media outlets.

In February 2023, Crunchyroll laid off 85 staff as part of employee redundancy between the 12 offices including its main Coppell headquarters and Culver City offices.

Programming

Funimation Channel

Funimation Entertainment, along with Olympusat, launched the Funimation Channel on September 29, 2005, the second 24-hour anime digital cable network in North America (the first being A.D. Vision's Anime Network). Olympusat was the exclusive distributor of the channel.

The channel had plans to launch an edition in Spanish, although without success. 

On March 23, 2006, a syndicated block was announced for Colours TV. A few months later, it was announced that the channel was launched in a few cities via VHF and UHF digital signals. Both services were discontinued in favor for a more successful expansion on digital cable, fiber optics and DBS systems. The channel launched its HD feed on September 27, 2010. On December 31, 2015, Funimation and Olympusat ended their deal and no longer broadcasts Funimation titles on the channel. The television channel was replaced by Toku. Funimation originally announced plans to relaunch Funimation Channel in 2016, which ultimately did not come into fruition.

Back in 2007, Funimation licensed Revolutionary Girl Utena: The Movie, the Record of Lodoss War series, the Project A-ko series, Urusei Yatsura: Beautiful Dreamer and Grave of the Fireflies from Central Park Media and played them on the Funimation Channel on television in the United States. In 2009, they licensed Buso Renkin, Honey and Clover, Hunter × Hunter, Nana and Monster from Viz Media (their fellow rival) for the channel. They also licensed Ninja Nonsense and Boogiepop Phantom from Right Stuf's Nozomi Entertainment division for it as well. The only title licensed for Funimation Channel which was not licensed by Funimation, neither Viz Media, nor Nozomi Entertainment or Central Park Media was Haré+Guu, which was licensed for North American distribution by AN Entertainment and Bang Zoom! Entertainment and had its North American DVD release published by Funimation, while its licensors were the producers. The only Enoki USA titles Funimation licensed for Funimation Channel were Revolutionary Girl Utena and His and Her Circumstances.

Digital
Funimation's catalog of series and films, as well as official Japanese simulcasts, are currently available for streaming on their website and dedicated apps. They currently stream over 800 titles from their catalog, Aniplex of America, Viz Media, Nozomi Entertainment, NIS America, and TMS Entertainment among other distributors. They currently are streaming titles in the United States, Canada, the United Kingdom, Ireland, Australia, New Zealand, Mexico, Brazil, Colombia, Chile, Peru, and by Wakanim they are also available in select parts of Europe, Africa, and Asia. Via Crunchyroll, they also have over 5 million subscribers 
and 120 million registered users worldwide with over 1,200 anime titles, 200 dorama, and 80 manga currently available from a wide array of distributors such as Sentai Filmworks and Discotek Media.

On September 19, 2006, Funimation created an official channel on YouTube where they upload advertisements for box sets, as well as clips and preview episodes of their licensed series. In September 2008, they began distributing full episodes of series on Hulu. In April 2009, Funimation began distributing full episodes of series at Veoh. In February 2012, Crackle began streaming select titles from Funimation, joining titles previously acquired from Funimation for their localized Animax hub.

A dedicated Funimation app launched for the PlayStation 3 and PlayStation 4 in December 2014 and March 2015, respectively. A Nintendo Switch app launched in December 2020.

SimulDub
In January 2014, English dubbed episodes of Space Dandy premiered on Adult Swim's Toonami programming block a day before the Japanese broadcast; one of the rare occasions an anime series premiered in the United States before Japan. Funimation would later introduce a new "SimulDub" program in October 2014, in which English dubs of their simulcast titles would premiere within weeks after their subtitled airing. This practice began with SimulDub versions of Psycho-Pass 2 and Laughing Under the Clouds, episodes of which were streamed roughly three weeks to one month following their original Japanese broadcast.

On March 18, 2020, Funimation announced that production of SimulDubs would be delayed due to the COVID-19 pandemic; Subtitled simulcasts would continue as scheduled. On April 10, 2020, Funimation announced that an episode of My Hero Academia had been recorded and would be released on April 12. Funimation would later announce the scheduled release dates for SimulDubs that were produced during the COVID-19 pandemic.

Following the corporate name change to Crunchyroll in 2022, the practice of SimulDubs officially continued with series such as Spy × Family, the second season of Classroom of the Elite and Tomo-chan is a Girl!.

Distribution
In July 2008, Funimation and Red Planet Media announced the launch of a mobile video on demand service for AT&T Mobility and Sprint mobile phone subscribers. Three titles were part of the launch, Gunslinger Girl, Tsukuyomi: Moon Phase, and The Galaxy Railways, with entire seasons of each made available.

Until 2016, Funimation did not directly release its properties in non-North American (English language speaking) markets, and instead sub-licensed its properties to other companies such as Revelation Films, MVM Entertainment, the UK branch of Manga Entertainment, and Anime Limited in the United Kingdom until 2016, and Madman Entertainment and Siren Visual in Australia and New Zealand until 2017. Funimation has also attempted to distribute Dragon Ball Z to Spanish speaking audiences, and has released a number of Spanish-language DVDs of the series.

In 2016, Funimation began directly releasing some of its titles in the United Kingdom and Ireland with Funimation branding, with Funimation handling licensing and localization, and Anime Limited handling distribution and classification. Funimation later distributed My Hero Academia in the region through Universal Pictures UK in 2017, and later through Sony Pictures UK, along with other select titles, in 2018. Funimation later began sub-licensing titles to Manga Entertainment's UK branch in late 2018, before acquiring the company on May 29, 2019, and releasing titles directly. On September 24, 2019, Sony Pictures Television and Aniplex consolidated their international anime streaming businesses, with Funimation becoming the leading company for the group.

Funimation also began directly distributing its titles in Australia and New Zealand in 2017. Similar to the UK and Ireland, select titles were released through Universal Sony Pictures Home Entertainment from 2017 to 2018. From September 2018, Funimation transferred distribution to Madman Anime, with the company handling distribution and classification within the region. Madman Anime was later consolidated into Funimation in 2019.

Lawsuits

Anti-piracy
In 2005, Funimation's legal department began to pursue a more aggressive approach toward protecting the company's licensed properties. They started sending "cease and desist" (C&D) letters to sites offering links to fansubs of their titles. This move was similar to that taken by the now-defunct ADV Films several years before with several major torrent sites.

Funimation's legal department served C&D letters for series that had not yet been advertised or announced as licensed, including Tsubasa: Reservoir Chronicle, Black Cat, and SoltyRei, with a few known series also mentioned in the letter. Funimation revealed more licenses on October 6, 2006, when it sent letters to torrent sites demanding that distribution of xxxHolic'''s TV series, Mushishi, Ragnarok the Animation, and other series cease.

Since October 2009, Funimation has routinely filed DMCA takedown notices to get unauthorized distributions of its and its partners' properties removed from Google search results.

In January 2011, Funimation filed a lawsuit against BitTorrent users in the U.S. for allegedly downloading and uploading One Piece. Funimation dropped the suit in March after a Northern Texas judge, having already indicated that the court would appoint attorneys for the defendants, ruled that the defendants were not "acting in concert" and thus could not be sued as a group; each would have to be sued separately.

The One Piece film at issue was a fansub, an unauthorized copy distributed with fan-produced, translated subtitles. Soon after the lawsuit was abandoned, Funimation was reported to have long been deriving dubs from fansubs. Nevertheless, Funimation continues to hold their stance that fansubbing is harmful to the anime industry, stating "The practices of illegal downloads and 'fansubbing' are very harmful to our Japanese partners and [...] we have been asked to monitor and take action against unauthorized distribution of these titles. Because we believe that this will benefit the industry, we have agreed to do so." Sites which distribute fansubs or separate fan-created subtitles remain a frequent target of civil actions by Funimation and other anime companies, as well as criminal prosecution in at least one case.

Two months after failing to sue BitTorrent users in the North Texas district, Funimation engaged in forum shopping and proceeded to sue 1,427 defendants in the neighboring East Texas district for acting "in concert" to infringe copyright on The Legend Is Born: Ip Man''. This case was allowed to proceed. However, the court dismissed the case against all remaining defendants with prejudice, on October 17, 2013.

Disputes with partners
In November 2011, Funimation sued A.D. Vision, AEsir Holdings, Section23 Films, Valkyrie Media Partners, Seraphim Studios, Sentai Filmworks and its CEO, John Ledford and Switchblade Pictures for a sum of $8 million, citing "breach of contracts" and other issues. Funimation said that ADV's transfer of assets were made with "the intent to defer, hinder or defraud the creditors of ADV [Films]." Funimation sought ADV's sale of assets as void. The lawsuit was settled in mediation in 2014. The terms of the settlement were not disclosed.

Vic Mignogna lawsuit

In early 2019, allegations of sexual misconduct against voice actor Vic Mignogna were brought forward on Twitter. Funimation conducted an internal investigation of the matter and announced on February 11, 2019, that they had ended their relations with Mignogna. On April 19, 2019, Mignogna filed a civil suit against Funimation and voice actors Jamie Marchi, Monica Rial, and Rial's fiancé, Ron Toye. Mignogna and his attorney were seeking a monetary relief of over $1 million. On June 12, 2019, Funimation filed a response denying Mignogna's allegations. On July 1, 2019, Funimation filed an anti-SLAPP motion for Mignogna to dismiss his lawsuit. Rial, Marchi, and Toye then filed their anti-SLAPP motions on July 19, 2019. A hearing to consider the defendants's anti-SLAPP motions took place on September 6, 2019; presiding Tarrant County judge John P. Chupp dismissed the civil suit against Marchi. On October 4, 2019, the civil suit against Funimation, Rial, and Toye was dismissed.

On October 24, 2019, Mignogna filed an appeal against the dismissal. On October 30, 2019, Rial, Toye, Marchi, and Funimation filed a motion to have Mignogna's appeal dismissed, which was subsequently denied. On November 5, 2019, Funimation filed a motion to recover attorney's fees, costs, and sanctions related to the lawsuit. On November 27, 2019, Tarrant County judge John P. Chupp ruled that Mignogna had to pay a total of $238,042.42 in attorney's fees and sanctions to Rial, Toye, Marchi, and Funimation.

Kojicast lawsuit
On April 24, 2019, Kojicast filed a lawsuit against Funimation claiming that the company's FunimationNow streaming service was an infringement on Kojicast's patent.

Shop lawsuit
On January 13, 2021, Jenisa Angeles filed a class-action lawsuit against Funimation, claiming that their online store failed to comply with the Americans with Disabilities Act. The suit was settled out of court. The terms of the settlement were not disclosed.

See also

Competitors
Sentai Filmworks, an anime distribution company based in Houston
ADV Films, the former anime distribution company
Aniplex of America, corporate sibling 
Discotek Media
Bandai Entertainment, the former distributor
Central Park Media, the defunct anime licensing company
Media Blasters
4Kids Entertainment, the former anime licensor based in New York
Viz Media
Eleven Arts
Shout! Factory
GKIDS

General
List of anime distributed in the United States
List of anime releases made concurrently in the United States and Japan

Notes

References

External links

 
 Crunchyroll corporate site
 Funimation's official website
 

Funimation
Funimation
1994 establishments in California
2005 mergers and acquisitions
2011 mergers and acquisitions
2017 mergers and acquisitions
American companies established in 1994
Anime and manga websites
Aniplex
Anime companies
Dubbing studios
Entertainment companies established in 1994
Home video distributors
Joint ventures
Mass media companies established in 1994
Subscription video on demand services